Saint Manuel and Saint Benedict (Spanish: San Manuel y San Benito) is a Catholic church located in Madrid, Spain.

The building, which was designed by Fernando Arbós y Tremanti, was built at the beginning of the twentieth century.  It was declared Bien de Interés Cultural in 1982.

See also 
Catholic Church in Spain
List of oldest church buildings

References

External links 

Byzantine Revival architecture in Spain
Manuel Y Benito
Bien de Interés Cultural landmarks in Madrid
Calle de Alcalá
Buildings and structures in Recoletos neighborhood, Madrid